Borj-e Zanganlu (also Romanized as Borj-e Zangānlū, Borj-e Zangālī, Borj Zangalanlū, and Burj Zanganali; also known as Borj) is a village in Atrak Rural District, Maneh District, Maneh and Samalqan County, North Khorasan Province, Iran. At the 2006 census, its population was 328, in 90 families.

References 

Populated places in Maneh and Samalqan County